was an aircraft carrier unit of the Imperial Japanese Navy's First Air Fleet.  At the beginning of the Pacific Campaign of World War II, the Second Carrier Division consisted of the fleet carriers Sōryū and Hiryū.  Both carriers were sunk at the Battle of Midway in June 1942 and were replaced by Jun'yō and Ryūjō.

Organization (extract)

Commander

References

Bibliography
The Maru Special series,  (Japan)
Ships of the World series, (Japan)

2
Units of the Imperial Japanese Navy Air Service
Military units and formations established in 1934
Military units and formations disestablished in 1944